is a former Japanese football player. He played for Japan national team.

Club career
Fujiguchi was born in Maebashi on August 17, 1949. After graduating from Keio University, he joined Mitsubishi Motors in 1974. From first season, the club won the 2nd place for 4 years in a row until 1977. In 1978, the club won all three major title in Japan; Japan Soccer League, JSL Cup and Emperor's Cup. The club also won 1980 Emperor's Cup, 1981 JSL Cup and 1982 Japan Soccer League. He retired in 1982. He played 127 games and scored 27 goals in the league. He was selected Best Eleven 3 times (1974, 1975 and 1978).

National team career
On July 12, 1972, when Fujiguchi was a Keio University student, he debuted for the Japan national team against Cambodia. He played at the 1974 World Cup qualification and the 1976 Asian Cup qualification. In 1978, he was also selected to play for Japan at the 1978 Asian Games and he played three games. That competition was his last game for Japan. He played 26 games and scored 2 goals for Japan until 1978.

Club statistics

National team statistics

References

External links
 
 Japan National Football Team Database

1949 births
Living people
Keio University alumni
Association football people from Gunma Prefecture
Japanese footballers
Japan international footballers
Japan Soccer League players
Urawa Red Diamonds players
Footballers at the 1978 Asian Games
Association football midfielders
Asian Games competitors for Japan